The Ministry of Ports, Shipping and Aviation is a cabinet ministry of the Government of Sri Lanka responsible for ports and shipping. The ministry is responsible for formulating and implementing national policy on ports and shipping and other subjects which come under its purview. The current Minister is Nimal Siripala de Silva. The ministry's secretary is M.M.P.K. Mayadunne.

Ministers
The Minister of Ports, Shipping and Aviation is a member of the Cabinet of Sri Lanka.

Secretaries

References

External links
 

Ports and Shipping
Ports, Shipping and Aviation
 
Sri Lanka
Transport organisations based in Sri Lanka